Jalan Sungai Tekali (Selangor state route B116) is a major road in Selangor, Malaysia.

List of junctions

Roads in Selangor

References